Ralph Sampson (born 1960) is an American former professional basketball player who is a member of the Naismith Memorial Basketball Hall of Fame.

Ralph Sampson may also refer to:

Ralph Sampson III (born 1990), American former basketball player who played in the 2010s, son of the Hall of Famer
Ralph Allan Sampson (1966–1939), British astronomer

See also
Ralph Simpson (born 1949), American basketball player who played in the 1970s